Jonghyun "Johnny" Son (born May 30, 2003) is a Canadian soccer player.

Club career

Sigma FC
In 2019, Son played for League1 Ontario club Sigma FC, making two appearances during the regular season, and two in the playoffs.

Forge FC
After training with the team in the summer of 2019, in June 2021 Forge FC announced Son was joining the club on a multi-year contract. He made his debut for Forge in a 2021 CONCACAF League match against Salvadoran side FAS on August 12.

Despite the multi-year contract, Son did not return to Forge for the 2022 season.

References

External links
 

2003 births
Living people
Canadian soccer players
Association football midfielders
Forge FC players
Canadian Premier League players
Soccer people from Ontario
Sportspeople from Oakville, Ontario
Sigma FC players